RU-38 may refer to:

Rosenlewin Urheilijat-38, Finnish former sports club from Pori
RU-38 (ice hockey) 
RU-38 (football) 
Schweizer RU-38 Twin Condor, a two or three-seat, fixed gear, low wing, twin boom covert reconnaissance aircraft